The , sold in some export markets as the Daihatsu Gran Move, is a mini MPV which was manufactured by the Japanese automaker Daihatsu from 1996 to 2002. It is based on the chassis of the G200 series Charade. The name "Pyzar" is derived from the Mongolian-era Silk Road traffic permit, "Paizah".

The Pyzar has a 50/50 split folding rear bench seat, which provided for it being registered as a four-passenger vehicle in most countries.

Mid-life facelift 
After three years in the market, the Pyzar received a mild facelift; the front fascia was slightly altered (the headlamps had clear turn signals) and body decals were rearranged to more in-line with the smaller L600 series Move's styling. Concurrently, a version with the 1.6 L engine replaced the previous 1.5 L one in export markets, except for the Japanese market, where both engines were sold together until the end of the sales in August 2002.

Engine 
 1,498 cc HE-EG 16-valve SOHC I4,  — export markets, until 1999
 1,498 cc HE-EG 16-valve SOHC I4,  — Japan, until 1999
 1,589 cc HD-EP 16-valve SOHC I4,  — export markets, introduced in 2000
 1,589 cc HD-EP 16-valve SOHC I4,  — Japan, introduced in 1999

Gallery

References 

Pyzar
Cars introduced in 1996
2000s cars
Mini MPVs
Front-wheel-drive vehicles
All-wheel-drive vehicles